Pulse - Social Democratic Students of Malta, or simply Pulse is a Student Organisation representing students through various institutions

History 
Pulse Social Democratic Students of Malta was founded on 19 March 1997, with the purpose of being an active organisation representing students all over the islands. Commencing operations at the G.F. Abela Junior College and the University of Malta, Pulse started fielding candidates for the students’ council elections, with a successful result and a notable track record, especially in KSJC: the Junior College students’ council.
In 2012, Pulse continued on its mission to expand its representation, becoming the first-ever recognised student society in MCAST, and therefore increasing its reach to all College campuses in Malta and Gozo. This was followed by recognition as the first-ever political student representation in the Gozo Sixth Form. In December 2013, Pulse obtained an absolute majority of votes and seats in KSM: the MCAST Students’ Council, together with the highest-ever turnout recorded in the Council’s history.

Throughout the years, Pulse’s active role in student activism led to active debate towards student representation. Throughout the years, Pulse voiced students’ concerns on matters such as stipend availability, public transportation issues, as well as numerous educational affairs. The latter included the campaign with regards to the ‘Legal Studies’ subject at the post-secondary level, which Pulse initiated and successfully moved forward in summer 2013. In September 2013, Pulse opened its Economic Affairs Review Board which compiled and presented the first-ever pre-budget document reaction from a student organisation to Finance Minister Edward Scicluna.

Pulse aims to continue expanding its representation

Executive council 

Pulse Executive 2021/22

Karl Schembri - President

Bjorn Caruana - External Vice President

Gabriel Camilleri - Internal Vice President

Erika Mallia - Sec Gen

Kieran Muscat - Financial Officer

Elton Cachia - KPS

Bahri Hanan - PRO

Kylie Bonnici - Media Officer

Jaelle Borg - Education Officer

Crystal Caruana - Human Resources

Amelia Cauchi - Leisure Officer

Antonella Rita Bonanno - Environmental Officer

Kirsten Pace - JC Coordinator

Sarah Bonnici - Assistant JC Coordinator

Zack Mangani - University Coordinator

Mikea Grech - MCAST Coordinator

Greta Caruana - Assistant MCAST Coordinator

Andre Borg - ITS Coordinator

Simona Refalo - Gozo Coordinator

Campaign 2021 - Focus 
Pulse – Social Democratic Students, launched a campaign with the name ‘Focus’, with the aim of giving students a platform to articulate their opinions as well as raising awareness about headline situations that are kept in the dark by the majority of society. It is time for students to break the silence and be more vocal on certain topics with no shame or guilt. Hence this campaign will be shedding light on mainly three sectors which are: Education, Well-being, and Environment. 

COVID-19 has impacted everyone from the early stages of childhood till adulthood let alone adolescents whether it is psychologically, physically, and/or financially. Studies show that 1 in 4 teenagers struggled with their mental health due to this pandemic yet problems which have been affecting their mental well-being have been existing from the beginning of time. This was never addressed in an appropriate manner. In addition, the pandemic affected the traditional methods of learning and the majority of the educational institutions had to transition to an online-based plan of action overnight leading to multiple flaws in the system. Pulse is known for being at the forefront of speaking on behalf of the students and tackling the situations presented to them in the best manner possible and the Covid-19 outbreak has not caused a setback in their mission. Not to mention, this global disruption has caused significant effects when it comes to the climate and the environment. During the lockdown, various articles revealed a short-term positive impact such as better air quality however there is still a long way to go especially in terms of single-use plastics, global warming, and many other environmental issues. 

Pulse has just launched this campaign by means of a video that is circulating all the social media platforms. This video features Pulse President Isaak Koroma and executive members Elisa Dimech, Emily Gatt, and Mariah Zammit where an overview is given highlighting the traits of the campaign ‘Focus’. Moreover, they are conveying a message to encourage students to not only be part of this campaign but to also engage in student activism and be part of the change. Every student deserves to have their voice heard. Be the change you wish to see in tomorrow’s future. It is your time to make some contribution by joining the campaign!

References 

Youth organisations based in Malta
1997 establishments in Malta
Student organizations established in 1997
Youth activists